Melkizedek Otim (1935-2019) was an Anglican bishop in Uganda: he was  Bishop of Lango from 1976 until 2001.

Otim was educated at Uganda Christian University and ordained deacon in 1967 and priest in 1979. He served the Diocese of Northern Uganda until his elevation to the episcopate.

References

Anglican bishops of Lango
21st-century Anglican bishops in Uganda
Uganda Christian University alumni
1935 births
2019 deaths